Valasakkadu is a panchayat village in Srimishnam Taluk, Cuddalore district, Tamil Nadu, India. The village has a total population of 1470 people with an even male-female ratio.

References

Villages in Cuddalore district